Rilove Janga (born 27 August 1987) is a Bonaire footballer who plays as a centre-back for Real Rincon and the Bonaire national team.

International career

Netherlands Antilles
Janga made his international debut for the Netherlands Antilles on 13 October 2010 in a 2–1 loss to Suriname. He went on to earn a total of five caps for the Netherlands Antilles before the disbandment of the Netherlands Antillean Football Union in February 2011, following the Dutch constituent country's dissolution in 2010.

Bonaire
On 14 November 2013, Janga made his debut for Bonaire in a 2–0 friendly loss to Suriname.

Career statistics

International goals
Scores and results list Bonaire's goal tally first.

References

External links

1987 births
Living people
Association football defenders
Bonaire footballers
Netherlands Antilles international footballers
Bonaire international footballers